Restricted may refer to:

R rating (disambiguation), list of subjects where "R" stands for "Restricted"
18 rating, media rating designation sometimes called "Restricted"
Restricted (country club), historical use of the term in country clubs in the United States
Restricted airspace, airspace for which air traffic is restricted or prohibited for safety or security concerns
Restricted area, several uses
Restricted free agent, a type of free agent in various professional sports
Restricted list, a roster status in Major League Baseball
Restricted stock, stock of a company that is not fully transferable

See also

Restrict, keyword in the C programming language
Restriction (disambiguation)